Menschen im Käfig (People in the Cage) is a 1930 British-made drama film directed by Ewald André Dupont and starring Conrad Veidt, Fritz Kortner and Tala Birell. It was the German-language version of the 1931 British International Pictures film Cape Forlorn. A French-language version Le cap perdu was also produced at the same time. It was based on a story by Frank Harvey.

Cast
 Conrad Veidt - Kingsley
 Fritz Kortner - Captain Kell
 Tala Birell - Eileen Kell
 Heinrich George - Cass
 Julius Brandt - Parsons

References

External links

1930 films
1930 drama films
1930s German-language films
British multilingual films
Films directed by E. A. Dupont
British drama films
British black-and-white films
1930 multilingual films
Works set in lighthouses
Films shot at British International Pictures Studios
1930s British films